The tornado outbreak of April 10–11, 2001, was a large tornado outbreak which affected the central Great Plains on April 10–11, 2001. During the two-day outbreak, it produced a total of 79 tornadoes across eight states including Kansas, Missouri, Oklahoma, Texas, Nebraska, Iowa, Illinois and Michigan. Four people were killed, 18 injured, and more than $23 million in damage was reported. The fatalities were reported in Oklahoma, Iowa and Missouri including two from a single tornado in Wapello County, Iowa.

The strongest tornado tracked for over 75 miles from northern Missouri to near Des Moines, Iowa causing extensive damage to several structures. In addition to that storm, a supercell on April 10 produced the largest and most damaging hail swath in history; as well as ten tornadoes.

Tornado event 
The first tornadoes developed during the late afternoon across west-central Missouri and mostly tracked near Interstate 70 eastward towards the St. Louis Metropolitan Area during the first half of the evening before weakening in Illinois.  In addition to the damaging hail (see Tri-State hailstorm section for details), several weak tornadoes were confirmed.  One tornado, however, killed a person inside a mobile home near the Fulton area in Callaway County

A new wave of tornadoes touched down further to the west in Nebraska, Kansas, Oklahoma and Texas during the late evening and overnight hours. One person was killed in Coal County, Oklahoma by an F2 tornado that threw the mobile home for about 200 yards before being destroyed. Several other significant tornadoes also caused extensive damage across southern Oklahoma, northern Texas and both the Oklahoma and Texas Panhandles until activity slowed down after dawn on April 11.

A final wave of tornadoes developed during the late morning and the afternoon hours mostly across Iowa where some of the strongest tornadoes took place. One tornado during the late morning carved a path of about 75 miles from northeast of Kansas City, Missouri to just southwest of Des Moines, Iowa. Several homes were destroyed or heavily damaged (earning an F3 rating) although there were no fatalities with this storm  Later during the day, an F2 tornado killed two people in Agency, Iowa (Wapello County) and destroyed or heavily damaged dozens of structures including a Lodge. The outbreak ended across western Michigan during the late afternoon.

Tornado table

Confirmed tornadoes

April 10 event

April 11 event

Tri-state hailstorm 

On April 10, a series of long-lived supercell thunderstorms moved from south-southwest of Kansas City, Kansas, across Missouri and often along I-70, impacting Columbia before striking the St. Louis metropolitan area, continuing into southern Illinois. The storms spawned ten weak tornadoes, one of which resulted in the first tornado fatality in Missouri since 1994.

Additionally, it produced the largest (in area) and longest (in distance and duration) recorded swaths of very large hail, up to baseball size, and also incurred the most expensive damages of any hailstorm in U.S. history. At $2 billion in insured losses, it was more costly in real dollars than the most damaging tornado at that time, the Oklahoma City Tornado of May 3, 1999. The cost of both were eclipsed by the catastrophic Joplin tornado in 2011, which cost $2.8 billion.

Hundreds of vehicles outside a Ford Assembly Plant in Hazelwood were damaged as well as almost every house within the city of Florissant in St. Louis County. Many automobile dealerships lost their entire auto inventory while thousands of additional homes were damaged. At Lambert International Airport, 22 jetliners suffered hail damage, while 10 aircraft of the Missouri National Guard were severely damaged.

See also 
 List of North American tornadoes and tornado outbreaks
 List of costly or deadly hailstorms

References

External links 
 NOAA page of the April 10 hail storm and tornado event (NWS St. Louis)
 Scientific Paper of the HP supercell event

F3 tornadoes
Tornadoes of 2001
Tornadoes in Iowa
Tornadoes in Kansas
Tornadoes in Missouri
Tornadoes in Nebraska
Tornadoes in Oklahoma
Tornadoes in Texas
2001 natural disasters in the United States
April 2001 events in the United States